The 2010 Morocco Tennis Tour – Tanger was a professional tennis tournament played on outdoor clay courts. It was part of the 2010 ATP Challenger Tour. It took place in Tangier, Morocco between 15 and 20 February 2010.

ATP entrants

Seeds

 Rankings are as of February 8, 2010.

Other entrants
The following players received wildcards into the singles main draw:
  Reda El Amrani
  Yassine Idmbarek
  Hicham Khaddari
  Mehdi Ziadi

The following players received entry from the qualifying draw:
  Francesco Aldi
  Bastian Knittel
  Pedro Sousa
  Fernando Vicente

The following players received entry as a lucky loser from the qualifying draw:
  Malek Jaziri

Champions

Singles

 Stéphane Robert def.  Oleksandr Dolgopolov Jr., 7–6(5), 6–4

Doubles

 Steve Darcis /  Dominik Meffert def.  Uladzimir Ignatik /  Martin Kližan, 5–7, 7–5, [10–7]

External links
 

Morocco Tennis Tour - Tanger
Morocco Tennis Tour – Tanger
2010 Morocco Tennis Tour